"Rise" is a single released by post-punk group Public Image Ltd in 1986. It was the first single from Album, their fifth studio album.

The song was written by John Lydon and Bill Laswell about apartheid in South Africa, specifically about Nelson Mandela as Lydon stated in a 2013 Glastonbury interview. Lydon also referred to alleged Royal Ulster Constabulary interrogation techniques, such as electric torture, in an MTV interview in 1987.  It was one of the group's biggest commercial hits, peaking at #11 on the UK Singles Chart. The song contains the phrase 'may the road rise with you', which is a direct translation of the old Irish blessing "go n-éirí an bóthar leat" (usually translated as "may the road rise up to meet you"). The phrase "anger is an energy" became the title of Lydon's 2014 autobiography.

Recording
Contributors on the song include Steve Vai on guitar, Tony Williams on drums, Bill Laswell on fretless bass, and L. Shankar on violin.

Tom Doyle of Sound on Sound said:
"[Sound engineer Jason Cosaro] ...set Williams up at the bottom of The Power Station’s elevator shaft, both close- and distance-miking the kit to create the distinctive drum sound on "Rise" in particular: Shure SM58 on the snare, Sennheiser MD 421s on the toms and Neumann U47 FETs for the ambience." Bill Laswell recalled:  “Myself and [guitarist] Nicky [Skopelitis] played in the control room... and everything was a first take. We were using the Fairlight computer as a kind of click track, and on the piece that became "Rise", Tony dropped a beat and we went back and dropped in this one beat. Otherwise I thought it was cool to be able to say everything was a first take."

Legacy
"Rise" was featured in the films The Rules of Attraction, The Promotion, Remarkable Power, and Body Brokers. It was also played during credits of the seventh episode of the second season of 13 Reasons Why.

Liam Howlett of The Prodigy included it on his instalment of the Back to Mine mix album series.

Cover versions

The song was covered by:
 Australian industrial metal band Jerk on their debut album When Pure Is Defiled
 Tripping Daisy on the EP Time Capsule (1997)
 Adrian Edmondson's folk band the Bad Shepherds' on the debut album Yan, Tyan, Tethera, Methera! (2009)
 Brazilian rock band Legião Urbana on the MTV Acústico album and DVD
 British band Love Amongst Ruin as a free download in July 2012
 Australian controversialist Kirin J. Callinan on his third solo album Return to Centre (2019)

Personnel
 John Lydon – lead vocals
 Steve Vai – guitar
 Ryuichi Sakamoto – Fairlight CMI
 Bill Laswell – fretless bass
 Tony Williams – drums
 L. Shankar – violin

When it was performed on Top of the Pops, Lydon was accompanied by Don Letts, Kevin Armstrong, Hugo Burnham amongst others.

Chart performance

References 

1986 singles
Public Image Ltd songs
Songs against racism and xenophobia
Songs written by John Lydon
1986 songs
Virgin Records singles
Song recordings produced by Bill Laswell